Gazza II is a football video game released for the Amstrad CPC, Amstrad GX4000 in 1990 for the ZX Spectrum, Amiga, Atari ST, Commodore 64, and IBM PC compatible platforms.  It was created by Empire Interactive and named after the popular English footballer Paul Gascoigne.

It is a sequel to Gazza's Superstar Soccer, and is a complete new game as opposed to being simply an update, this time adopting an overhead horizontally scrolling display. The game was later included in the compilation Soccer Stars.

References

External links
 Gazza II at ysrnry.co.uk
 Stadium64 Reviews Archive: Gazza II
 CPC Games review - G at cpcgamereviews.com
 Gazza II at www.zee-3.com/pickfordbros

1990 video games
Amiga games
Association football video games
Atari ST games
DOS games
Video game sequels
Amstrad CPC games
Amstrad GX4000 games
ZX Spectrum games
Commodore 64 games
Video games scored by David Whittaker
Video games developed in the United Kingdom
Video games based on real people
Cultural depictions of association football players
Cultural depictions of British men
Empire Interactive games